His Majesty's Prison, Hydebank Wood (normally known as just Hydebank) is a women's prison located in South Belfast.

Young male offenders
A young offenders centre (YOC) holding young male prisoners is located on the same site. The YOC houses young males between 18 and 24 years of age, and the site has also been used at times to hold immigration detainees. The institution put a great deal of effort into improving the diet of young offenders and this transformed many of them for the better.

External links
 Northern Ireland prison service

References

Prisons in Northern Ireland
Young Offender Institutions in Northern Ireland
Women's prisons in the United Kingdom